Cycetogamasus is a genus of mites in the family Parasitidae.

Species
 Cycetogamasus californicus (Banks, 1904)     
 Cycetogamasus corculatus Athias-Henriot, 1980     
 Cycetogamasus coreanus Athias-Henriot, 1980     
 Cycetogamasus denticulatus (Tikhomirov, 1971)     
 Cycetogamasus diviortus (Athias-Henriot, 1967)     
 Cycetogamasus insolitus Athias-Henriot, 1980     
 Cycetogamasus planeticus Hennessey & Farrier, 1989     
 Cycetogamasus squamatus Athias-Henriot, 1980

References

Parasitidae